André Kagwa Rwisereka (31 December 1949 – 13 July 2010) was vice-chairman of the Democratic Green Party of Rwanda, a political party founded in August 2009 in Rwanda.
He was found murdered and partially beheaded near a wetland in Butare on 14 July 2010.
The party chairman Frank Habineza was among opposition leaders who called for an independent international investigation into the murder, which may have had a political motivation.

Rwisereka was born on 31 December 1949 in Rusenge, Nyaruguru, Southern Province, Rwanda. 
In the early 1960s he went into political exile in the Democratic Republic of Congo, where he was a senior member of the Rwandan Patriotic Front during its struggle to liberate Rwanda. 
After returning to Rwanda he became a prominent businessman in Butare.
He was a founding member of the Democratic Green Party of Rwanda on 14 August 2009.

See also
Other opponents or perceived opponents of the Rwandan government murdered between 2010 and 2012:
 Charles Ingabire (politician)
 Jean-Léonard Rugambage (journalist)
 Théogène Turatsinze (businessman)

References

1949 births
2010 deaths
Assassinated Rwandan politicians
Deaths by decapitation
Democratic Green Party of Rwanda politicians
People murdered in Rwanda
People from Nyaruguru District
Rwandan exiles
Rwandan expatriates in the Democratic Republic of the Congo
Rwandan murder victims
2010s murders in Rwanda
2010 crimes in Rwanda
2010 murders in Africa